Robert Marsh may refer to:

Robert T. Marsh (1925 - 2017), United States Air Force general
Robert H. Marsh (born 1952), American politician and political aide
Robert James Marsh, mathematician and Whitehead Prize winner
Robert McC. Marsh (1878–1958), American lawyer, politician, and judge
Robert Marsh (cyclist) (born 1968), cyclist from Antigua and Barbuda
Robert Marsh (banker), Governor of the Bank of England, 1762–1764
Robert Burkall Marsh (born 1950), Welsh-born painter in New Zealand